2015 Piala Presiden may refer to either:

 2015 Indonesia President's Cup
 2015 Piala Presiden (Malaysia)